Glasgow Warriors are a professional rugby union side from Scotland. The team plays in the United Rugby Championship league and in the European Professional Club Rugby tournaments. In the 2014–15 season they won the Pro12 title and became the first Scottish team to win a major trophy in rugby union's professional era. The side is known for its fast, dynamic and attacking style of play, using offloads and quick rucks. Defensively the club prides itself on its 'Fortress Scotstoun' where the club play at home.

History

Glasgow Warriors are a continuation of the amateur Glasgow District side founded in 1872.

For the history of Glasgow as an amateur district side see:

Reshaped as a professional club in 1996, Glasgow Warriors were originally known as Glasgow Rugby before rebranding as Glasgow Caledonians in 1998 by a merger with the Caledonian Reds. They dropped the Caledonians to become Glasgow Rugby in 2001 again and finally rebranded as the Glasgow Warriors in 2005.

Origins: District Sides

Scotland had four District Sides:- North and Midlands; South; Glasgow District and Edinburgh District. Glasgow and Edinburgh were formed in 1872 and played the world's first ever inter-district match on 23 November of that year. This was known as the 'Inter-City' derby; originally a twice a season event until 1876, then became annual thereafter.

The district sides capped the best amateur players from their area's club sides to play inter-district matches and matches against touring sides. The Scottish Inter-District Championship began in 1953-54 (and so encompassed the traditional Inter-City derby). Unlike the Scottish clubs (and Ireland's provincial sides), the Scottish district sides had no settled home and were not members of their Rugby Union. This meant when Scottish rugby embraced professionalism it was not clear if a model based on districts or clubs would be used.

Professional model: Club or District debate

It was not clear which route professionalism would go in Scotland. This created a turbulent start for professionalism in Scotland and left Scotland far behind fast-embracing Ireland in the set up of its professional structure. The first season of the Heineken Cup in 1995–96 was run without any Scottish teams in European competition.

An EGM was held by the SRU for its member clubs to debate the matter and try and settle the issue on 8 February 1996. The SRU management was in favour of districts and its Vice-President Fred McLeod, and Jim Telfer argued for the proposal. In favour of the clubs to be represented in Europe were former Scotland internationalists Gavin Hastings and Keith Robertson. Critically a speech from the floor from Brian Simmers of Glasgow Academicals – arguing that Hastings and Robertson didn't have the best interests of Scottish rugby at heart and they were arguing only for their own clubs – swung the debate and the District model won by 178 to 24.

The four amateur district teams Glasgow, Edinburgh, South of Scotland and North and Midlands were to become the professional sides Glasgow Warriors, Edinburgh Rugby, Border Reivers and the Caledonia Reds.

Professionalisation: Glasgow Warriors

Glasgow Rugby was created in 1996 to compete in the Heineken Cup, because the Scottish Rugby Union did not think that Scottish club sides would be able to compete against the best teams from France and England.

For a detailed season by season guide of Glasgow Warriors history see:

Scottish Inter-District Championship era

Glasgow and the other three Scottish districts competed in the Scottish Inter-District Championship to determine their European Qualifying; the leagues positions determining whether they entered the Heineken Cup or the Challenge Cup for the following season.

Due to Glasgow District's bottom placing in the 1995–96 Scottish Inter-District Championship, Glasgow was entered into the 1996–97 European Challenge Cup where they finished second bottom of their group.

Results improved somewhat domestically in 1996-97 with Glasgow securing second place in that season's Inter-District Championship behind Caledonia Reds.

That meant that Glasgow qualified for the Heineken Cup for the first time, in the 1997–98 season. In their group stage that season finishing second, they qualified out of the group only to be well beaten in the Quarter Final play-off by Leicester Tigers.

Merger with Caledonia Reds

Because of the SRU's high debt, partly as a result of the redevelopment of Murrayfield Stadium, there was a recognised need for further reorganisation. After two seasons, Glasgow merged with the Caledonia Reds to form a team that would be known as Glasgow Caledonians.

Edinburgh Rugby similarly merged with the Border Reivers. In effect, both the Glasgow and Edinburgh clubs took over the other districts. Glasgow's new 'Caledonian' label was later quietly dropped at the start of the 2001–02 season, with the team name becoming once again Glasgow Rugby. The Glasgow side however became colloquially known as Glasgow Warriors from at least the 2001–02 season onwards.

Only two professional sides remaining meant that the 1998–99 Scottish Inter-District Championship was fought out in a three match 'Tri-Series' battle between Glasgow and Edinburgh.

The combined sides did not fare better in Europe. Glasgow finished bottom of their group in the 1998–99 Heineken Cup. The SRU realised that Glasgow and Edinburgh needed more competition domestically than each other and so began a successful dialogue with the Welsh Rugby Union that resulted in both Scottish sides being entered in the WRU Challenge Cup in early 1999.

Welsh-Scottish League era

The WRU Challenge Cup was deemed a success and the SRU and WRU announced a new league system for the 1999-2000 season. The Welsh-Scottish League was essentially the Welsh Premier Division augmented by the Glasgow and Edinburgh sides.

This meant the end of the Scottish Inter-District Championship although it did continue as before with the amateur district sides. The 1999-2000 season's Tri-Series was run without a sponsor. Glasgow won the title, but at a cost; they had beaten Edinburgh four times that season (including twice in the Tri-Series) and Edinburgh's only win was the 5th match, a dead rubber at the end of the Tri-Series. The fans didn't like the format and it was scrapped.

The Welsh-Scottish League lasted three seasons. Although both Glasgow and Edinburgh finished no higher than mid-table for those three seasons, it did provide the Scottish sides with much needed competition. It was looked on as a successful model of co-operation between two rugby unions. The Irish Rugby Football Union began talks with the SRU and WRU about further extending the co-operation in a new Celtic League.

Celtic League era

The Celtic League began in truncated fashion in the autumn of 2001 with the addition of the four Irish provincial teams in two pools; Glasgow reached the semi-finals of the inaugural competition, but struggled thereafter.

In its first year the Celtic League ran concurrently with the 2001–02 Welsh-Scottish League but fixture congestion meant that the Welsh-Scottish tournament was scrapped in favour of the new league. The new Celtic League was an instant success and the SRU took the opportunity to resurrect one of its disbanded districts in 2002. The Border Reivers were thus reborn for 2002–03 season.

The Celtic League remained in its truncated 'pools' form for 2002–03 season before its expansion to a full league set-up the following season. This gave the SRU a one-off chance to revive the 2002–03 Scottish Inter-District Championship as a professional tournament. Glasgow, Edinburgh and the Borders fought in out in what was the final professional Inter-District championship; the Bank of Scotland Pro Cup. Glasgow finished bottom of the table.

In 2004–05 Glasgow had been fifth in the Celtic League, the best placing of the three Scottish teams that existed at that time.

Starting with the 2005–06 season, the team was again rebranded, this time as the Glasgow Warriors.

1872 Cup

Disappointing results for the Border Reivers saw them disband again in 2007. With only two professional sides once again, the SRU took the opportunity to dust down and rename the 1995 Scottish Inter-District Championship trophy and use the two Celtic League fixtures between Glasgow Warriors and Edinburgh Rugby as a mini-cup tournament. The Glasgow-Edinburgh 'inter-city' derby dates back to 1872 and is the oldest provincial match in the world. To mark this, the 1872 Cup thus began in 2007-08.

Pro12 era

The Celtic League was rebranded as the Pro12 league in season 2011–12. This was to better reflect the entry of the Italian sides into the Celtic League.

The Pro12 league format had a top four play-off system to decide the champions.

Since the Pro12 started in season 2011–12, Glasgow Warriors were the only team that have made the play-offs in every year, but this record was finally broken at the end of the 2016–17 season on 28 April 2017 when the Warriors lost to Leinster in Dublin ensuring that a top 4 finish for the Glasgow side was unattainable.

Glasgow Warriors hold the Pro12 record of the highest number of consecutive seasons that a team has made the play-offs – with 5 seasons between 2011–12 and 2015–16. Going further back and taking the Celtic League into account, this record is also shared with Leinster who made the play-offs in the last 2 years of the Celtic League and first 3 years of the Pro12.

Pro14 era

With the addition of two South African sides, the Pro12 expanded to become the Pro14 for season 2017-18.

The format of the league changed to accommodate the extra teams. It was split into two conferences and matches played in a conference system with the addition of 2 derby fixtures. The play-off system also changed with the winners of the conferences hosting a Semi-Final and each conference runners up and 3rd place teams playing off in Quarter-Final fixtures.

For the Pro14's inaugural season, Glasgow Warriors were placed in a conference with the Ospreys, Blues, Munster, Connacht, Zebre and Cheetahs. After a blistering start with 10 straight wins, the Warriors were the first team to secure a play-off place. The Warriors won top place in Conference A and secured a home semi-final. Inconsistent form in the latter half of the season then cost the Warriors; losing in the semi-final to Scarlets.

Glasgow Warriors' conference did not change for season 2018-19 but home and away fixtures were swapped from the previous year.
Other than a blip against the Southern Kings and a notable dip in the Festive period against Edinburgh and Benetton Treviso, by and large Glasgow Warriors seemed to ease through their fixtures. By the end of the regular season Glasgow were top of Conference A again and setting new records:- the final regular season match against Edinburgh Rugby saw the Warriors hit a club record of 7 consecutive try bonus point league wins; their total of 15 try bonus points throughout the season was a new Pro14 record; their 81 points scored was the most ever scored in a league campaign by Glasgow Warriors; and their 83 tries was the most scored in a league campaign by Glasgow Warriors; and their 621 points scored was the most scored in a league campaign by Glasgow Warriors. They narrowly lost to Leinster in the final at Celtic Park following an error by Stuart Hogg in the Warriors try-line. The Celtic Park final attendance, swelled by Glasgow Warriors fans normally unable to watch at a sold-out Scotstoun, remains the highest in the Celtic League/Pro12/Pro14 history.

In 2019–20, the Warriors started poorly but results picked up as the season progressed. By the end of February 2020, Glasgow Warriors had solidified the play-off 3rd spot and were hopeful of a decent run to overtake Ulster into the 2nd place in their conference. However, the COVID-19 pandemic intervened and Pro14 matches were stopped. The season restarted at the end of August; but it was instead curtailed, now with only two matches to play, meaning it was virtually impossible to catch Ulster in the second spot. Worse for the Warriors was the Pro14 decision to not play any Quarter-Final matches which meant that they would not be involved in the play-offs. Missing out, the final was played between Leinster and Ulster, with Leinster winning.

Season 2020-21 was still affected with the COVID-19 pandemic; this meant very limited or usually no fans at the matches. The Southern Kings went bankrupt and the Cheetahs were unable to compete due to the pandemic, so the Pro14 ran with 12 European sides, still in two conferences. They did however court some of the South African Super Rugby Unlocked franchises for the following season and organised an end of season tournament – the Rainbow Cup – which because of COVID-19 was run as a mini European league of the Pro14 sides; and a South African league of their 4 biggest franchises that the Pro14 wished to invite – the winners of the two leagues would play off in a final. Glasgow Warriors stuttered in the Pro14 and only improved towards the end of the tournament. They managed to still secure a Champions Cup spot despite their early form. The end of season Rainbow Cup saw Glasgow lose their match against the surprise eventual Rainbow Cup tournament winners Benetton Treviso but then win the rest of their matches, securing the 1872 Cup along the way and beating this season's Pro14 winners Leinster in their last match.

United Rugby Championship era

The European sides were again joined by the South African franchises in season 2021–22. The championship was split in four conferences:- a Scottish-Italian conference, a South African conference, a Welsh conference and an Irish conference. The Warriors stuttered through the URC campaign. They seemed to have a bad knack of winning fixtures until the last quarter and then blowing their lead. Still, home results remained a bit better than the away fixtures. By the end of April they were just about managing to cling onto top 4 in the URC. Then the form stopped stuttering, but unfortunately things got worse. They bowed out of the Champions Cup at the hands of La Rochelle (the eventual winners of the European Cup that season), to find themselves in the Challenge Cup. A win against Newcastle Falcons papered over cracks but they were beaten in the quarter-final against Lyon, again losing the match from a winning position. (Lyon went on to win the Challenge Cup.)

Beaten by both European winners may have been understandable but the Glasgow side's league form was much worse and a run of away fixtures hardly helped. Beaten by the Stormers and Bulls, the Warriors lost the 1872 Cup deciding match to Edinburgh. Not only did Edinburgh secure the 1872 Cup, but it meant that Edinburgh leapfrogged Glasgow Warriors in the league and also won the Scottish-Italian conference. Glasgow Warriors finished 8th; their lowest league position since 2010–11. It was the first time that Edinburgh finished higher than Glasgow since that 2010–11 season. Finishing 8th meant that Glasgow failed to qualify for the Champions Cup next season. The last time that happened was the 2005–06 season, causing Hugh Campbell to lose his job; and they played the 2006–07 season in the Challenge Cup under Sean Lineen. Eighth place in 2021-22 did qualify the Warriors for the last quarter-final place of the URC, but they were given the 1st seeds Leinster in Dublin to play. The Warriors failed to regroup for the quarter-final and although they again started brightly the team predictably slumped. It was quite a slump too, a 76–14 defeat: it was the Warriors worst result domestically; and their second-worse result of all time. Only the Leicester Tigers European quarter-final play-off match of 1997–98 season, a 90–19 defeat, was worse. The SRU was quick to act in the face of these poor results and Danny Wilson was stood down as Head Coach.

Stadium

For the most part, Glasgow Warriors through the years have played their matches in Glasgow either at Hughenden Stadium, Firhill Stadium or Scotstoun Stadium, their current base.

A closer look at the club's history reveals a more nomadic nature. Some of this was planned as the club took over the Caledonia Reds district; or a liberal spreading of the Warriors brand to various grounds for friendlies and smaller ties; and some of this was caused by inclement weather; in particular the Warriors had to play several games at the football ground of Kilmarnock F.C. in 2015/16. The laying of a synthetic pitch at Scotstoun Stadium for the 2016-17 season resolved those weather-related issues, though there have on occasion been complaints from visiting teams about the synthetic surface.

Stadia moves

Originally based at Hughenden Stadium in 1996-97, Glasgow moved to Scotstoun Stadium for the 1997-98 season. Rugby at Scotstoun, however, goes back even further, right to the beginning of the 1900s when the likes of Glasgow HSFP and Kelvinside Accies along with others played there on their journeys to Old Anniesland and Balgray respectively.

The merger with the Caledonia Reds for the season caused the Warriors to play their matches not only at Hughenden and Firhill Stadium in Glasgow, but also at Perth's McDiarmid Park and Aberdeen's Rubislaw Playing Fields as it consolidated the traditional North and Midlands district.

The following year saw the Warriors additionally play at Bridgehaugh Park in Stirling. the Caledonian Stadium in Inverness and Millbrae in Ayr.

From the 2000-01 season Glasgow settled in Hughenden through to the middle of 2005-06 season, after which Firhill was used briefly. However the following year Hughenden was used again.

The Warriors moved to Firhill Stadium in 2007–08 season and that was the club's base until the summer of 2012.

In 2012, Glasgow Warriors moved from Firhill back to Scotstoun Stadium, which had previously been the club's training base.

In addition to those grounds above:- Rugby Park in Kilmarnock; Old Anniesland in Glasgow; Braidholm in Giffnock; Whitecraigs in Newton Mearns; London Road in Stranraer; Burnbrae in Milngavie, North Inch in Perth and Murrayfield Stadium in Edinburgh have all hosted home matches for the Glasgow side.

Fans
Glasgow Warriors fans are collectively known as the Warrior Nation. The official supporters club is The XVIth Warrior, founded in 2012.

Home

Although the current Scotstoun Stadium capacity has been occasionally been increased to 10,000 for selected matches, from the 2016–17 season the standard capacity at home is now 7351, which regularly sells out. There is now a record number of season ticket holders at the club.

Such is the demand for tickets at Glasgow, it has been reported that Mark Dodson, chief executive of the Scottish Rugby Union, is in talks with Glasgow City Council about building a bigger stand on the railway side of Scotstoun Stadium.

A quirk of such high demand is seen when you compare the 2015-16 standard capacity at Scotstoun (6800) with Glasgow's seasonal average attendance (6950) The seasonal higher than capacity average was made possible when Scotstoun Stadium became unplayable that winter and home games were switched to the higher capacity grounds of Rugby Park and Murrayfield Stadium.

Away

The away support of the Glasgow Warriors ranges from about 300 fans for a Pro12 match in Italy to around several thousand fans for the 1872 Cup away match against Edinburgh Rugby at Murrayfield Stadium.

The Pro12 Grand Finals of 2013–14 season and 2014–15 season, in Dublin and Belfast respectively, saw around 4 to 5 thousand of the Warrior Nation follow their team to Ireland each time.

The 2016-17 European Champions Cup Quarter Final away to Saracens saw 6000 of the Warrior Nation make their way to Allianz Park and provided the London side with their highest ever home attendance.

Fanzones

Various public houses around Glasgow have operated as Fanzones for the club. The official Fanzone for the 2016–17 season was The Crafty Pig. For 2018–19 season The Old Schoolhouse is the XVIth Warriors fanzone.

Records and Achievements

For Amateur era see:

Honours

 Pro12 & Pro14
 Winners: 1 (2014-15)
 Runners-up: 2 (2013-14, 2018-19)
United Rugby Championship Scottish/Italian Shield
Runners Up: 1 (2021-22)
 Scottish Inter-District Championship
 Winners: 1 (1999-2000 Tri-Series)
 1872 Cup (founded 2007–08)
 Winners: 9 (2007–08, 2009–10, 2010–11, 2011–12, 2012–13, 2013–14, 2016–17, 2020–21, 2022-23)
 Melrose Sevens
 Winners: 2 (2013–14, 2014–15)
 Glasgow City Sevens
 Winners: 3 (2003–04, 2010–11, 2012–13)

Season standings

Competing as Glasgow Warriors unless stated.
Competing as ᵜ Glasgow Rugby.
Competing as β Glasgow Caledonian Reds.

League competitions

{| class="wikitable" style="text-align:center; width:90%"
|-
! style="width:13%;" | Season
! style="width:15%;" | Pos
! style="width:4%;"  | Pld
! style="width:4%;"  | W
! style="width:4%;"  | D
! style="width:4%;"  | L
! style="width:4%;"  | F
! style="width:4%;"  | A
! style="width:5%;"  | +/-
! style="width:4%;"  | BP
! style="width:4%;"  | Pts
! style="width:35%;" | Notes

|- style="background:#FFE6BD;"
| 1996–97 ᵜ     || 2nd           ||  3 ||  2 || 0 ||  1 ||  63 ||  51 ||  +12 ||  – || 4  || style="text-align:left;" | 

|- style="background:#FFE6BD;"
| 1997–98 ᵜ     || 2nd           ||  3 ||  2 || 0 ||  1 ||  66 ||  29 ||  +37 ||  – || 4  || style="text-align:left;" | (second on tries scored)

|- style="background:#FFE6BD;"
| 1998–99 β     || 2nd           ||  3 ||  1 || 0 ||  2 ||  32 ||  97 ||  −65 ||  – || 2  || style="text-align:left;" | (Edinburgh won Tri-series 2–1)

|- style="background:#FFE6BD;"
| 1999–2000 β || 1st           ||  3 ||  2 || 0 ||  1 || 104 ||  56 ||  +48 ||  – || 4  || style="text-align:left;" | (Glasgow won Tri-series 2–1)

|- style="background:#FCC;"
| 1999–2000 β || 10th          || 22 ||  8 || 1 || 13 || 488 || 621 || −133 ||  – || 25 || style="text-align:left;" | 

|- style="background:#FCC;"
| 2000–01 β     || 7th           || 22 || 12 || 0 || 10 || 645 || 608 ||  +37 ||  – || 36 || style="text-align:left;" | 

|- style="background:#FCC;"
| 2001–02 ᵜ     || 8th           || 20 ||  8 || 1 || 11 || 475 || 527 ||  −52 ||  – || 25 || style="text-align:left;" | 

|- style="background:#FFA6AA;"
| 2001–02 ᵜ     || 3rd in Pool A ||  7 ||  4 || 1 ||  2 || 204 || 172 ||  +32 ||  – || 13 || style="text-align:left;" | (lost semi-final to Leinster) 

|- style="background:#FFE6BD;"
| 2002–03 ᵜ     || 3rd           ||  8 ||  2 || 1 ||  5 || 144 || 210 ||  −66 ||  1 || 11 || style="text-align:left;" | Bank of Scotland Pro Cup

|- style="background:#FFA6AA;"
| 2002–03 ᵜ     || 2nd in Pool B ||  7 ||  5 || 0 ||  2 || 216 || 166 ||  +50 ||  3 || 23 || style="text-align:left;" | (lost quarter-final to Ulster)

|- style="background:#FFA6AA;"
| 2003–04 ᵜ     || 11th          || 22 ||  6 || 1 || 15 || 442 || 614 || −172 ||  6 || 32 || style="text-align:left;" | 

|- style="background:#FFA6AA;"
| 2004–05 ᵜ     || 6th           || 20 ||  8 || 1 || 11 || 465 || 466 ||   −1 || 11 || 45 || style="text-align:left;" | 

|- style="background:#FFA6AA;"
| 2005–06       || 11th          || 22 ||  5 || 0 || 15 || 371 || 439 ||  −68 ||  9 || 37 || style="text-align:left;" | (All deemed + 2 games: 8 pts)

|- style="background:#FFA6AA;"
| 2006–07       || 7th           || 20 || 11 || 0 ||  9 || 434 || 419 ||  +15 ||  5 || 49 || style="text-align:left;" | 

|- style="background:#FFA6AA;"
| 2007–08       || 5th           || 18 || 10 || 1 ||  7 || 340 || 349 ||   −9 ||  4 || 46 || style="text-align:left;" | 

|- style="background:#FFA6AA;"
| 2008–09       || 7th           || 18 ||  7 || 0 || 11 || 349 || 375 ||  −26 ||  9 || 37 || style="text-align:left;" | 

|- style="background:#FFA6AA;"
| 2009–10       || 3rd           || 18 || 11 || 2 ||  5 || 390 || 321 ||  +69 ||  3 || 51 || style="text-align:left;" | (lost semi-final to Ospreys)

|- style="background:#FFA6AA;"
| 2010–11       || 11th          || 22 ||  6 || 1 || 15 || 401 || 543 || −142 ||  7 || 33 || style="text-align:left;" | 

|- style="background:#F8EDFA;"
| 2011–12       || 4th           || 22 || 13 || 4 ||  5 || 445 || 321 || +124 ||  5 || 65 || style="text-align:left;" | (lost semi-final to Leinster)

|- style="background:#F8EDFA;"
| 2012–13       || 3rd           || 22 || 16 || 0 ||  6 || 541 || 324 || +217 || 12 || 76 || style="text-align:left;" | (lost semi-final to Leinster)

|- style="background:#F8EDFA;"
| 2013–14       || 2nd & RU      || 22 || 18 || 0 ||  4 || 484 || 309 || +175 ||  7 || 79 || style="text-align:left;" | (lost final to Leinster)

|- style="background:#F8EDFA;"
| 2014–15       || 1st & CH      || 22 || 16 || 1 ||  5 || 540 || 360 || +180 ||  9 || 75 || style="text-align:left;" | (defeated Munster in final)

|- style="background:#F8EDFA;"
| 2015–16       || 3rd           || 22 || 13 || 1 ||  7 || 557 || 380 || +177 || 14 || 72 || style="text-align:left;" | (lost semi-final to Connacht)

|- style="background:#F8EDFA;"
| 2016–17       || 6th           || 22 || 11 || 0 || 11 || 540 || 464 ||  +76 || 14 || 58 || style="text-align:left;" | 

|- style="background:#C6E7FA;"
| 2017–18       || 1st in Conf A ||  21 ||  15 || 1 ||  5 || 614 || 366 || +248 ||  14 || 76 || style="text-align:left;" | (lost semi-final to Scarlets)

|- style="background:#C6E7FA;"
| 2018–19       || 1st Cf A & RU ||  21 ||  16 || 0 ||  5 || 621 || 380 || +241 ||  17 || 81 || style="text-align:left;" | (lost final to Leinster)

|- style="background:#C6E7FA;"
| 2019–20       || 3rd in Conf A ||  15 ||  8 || 0 ||  7 || 364 || 329 || +35 ||  6 || 38 || style="text-align:left;" | (no quarter-final place as tournament curtailed)

|- style="background:#C6E7FA;"
| 2020–21       || 4th in Conf A ||  16 ||  6 || 0 || 10 || 335 || 377 || -42 ||  6 || 30 || style="text-align:left;" |

|- style="background:#16FB2B;"
| 2020–21       || 3rd in Europ. League ||  5 ||  4 || 0 || 1 || 121 || 117 || +4 ||  3 || 19 || style="text-align:left;" |

|- style="background:#FF6000;"
| 2021–22       || 8th ||  18 ||  10 || 0 || 8 || 409 || 376 || +33 ||  10 || 50 || style="text-align:left;" | (lost quarter-final to Leinster)
|}

European competitions

{| class="wikitable"
|- border=1 cellpadding=5 cellspacing=0
! style="width:80px;"| Season
! style="width:100px;"|Pos
! style="width:20px;"|Pld
! style="width:20px;"|W
! style="width:20px;"|D
! style="width:20px;"|L
! style="width:20px;"|F
! style="width:20px;"|A
! style="width:25px;"|+/-
! style="width:20px;"|BP
! style="width:20px;"|Pts
! |Notes

|- align=center
|  style="text-align:left; background:#ccffcc;"|
|  style="text-align:left; background:#ccffcc;"|
| style="background:#ccffcc;"|5|| style="background:#ccffcc;"|1|| style="background:#ccffcc;"|0|| style="background:#ccffcc;"|4|| style="background:#ccffcc;"|113|| style="background:#ccffcc;"|202|| style="background:#ccffcc;"|-89|| style="background:#ccffcc;"|-|| style="background:#ccffcc;"|2|| style="background:#ccffcc;"|

|- align=center
|  style="text-align:left; background:#ffffcc;"|1997–98  ᵜ
|  style="text-align:left; background:#ffffcc;"|
| style="background:#ffffcc;"|6|| style="background:#ffffcc;"|3|| style="background:#ffffcc;"|0|| style="background:#ffffcc;"|3|| style="background:#ffffcc;"|132|| style="background:#ffffcc;"|167|| style="background:#ffffcc;"|-35|| style="background:#ffffcc;"|-|| style="background:#ffffcc;"|6|| style="background:#ffffcc;"|

|- align=center
|  style="text-align:left; background:#ffffcc;"|1998–99 β
|  style="text-align:left; background:#ffffcc;"|4th in Pool 4
| style="background:#ffffcc;"|6|| style="background:#ffffcc;"|2|| style="background:#ffffcc;"|0|| style="background:#ffffcc;"|4|| style="background:#ffffcc;"|121|| style="background:#ffffcc;"|187|| style="background:#ffffcc;"|-66|| style="background:#ffffcc;"|-|| style="background:#ffffcc;"|4|| style="background:#ffffcc;"|

|- align=center
|  style="text-align:left; background:#ffffcc;"|
|  style="text-align:left; background:#ffffcc;"|3rd in Pool 1
| style="background:#ffffcc;"|6|| style="background:#ffffcc;"|2|| style="background:#ffffcc;"|0|| style="background:#ffffcc;"|4|| style="background:#ffffcc;"|130|| style="background:#ffffcc;"|179|| style="background:#ffffcc;"|-49|| style="background:#ffffcc;"|-|| style="background:#ffffcc;"|4|| style="background:#ffffcc;"|

|- align=center
|  style="text-align:left; background:#ffffcc;"|2000–01 β
|  style="text-align:left; background:#ffffcc;"|4th in Pool 6
| style="background:#ffffcc;"|6|| style="background:#ffffcc;"|1|| style="background:#ffffcc;"|0|| style="background:#ffffcc;"|5|| style="background:#ffffcc;"|137|| style="background:#ffffcc;"|227|| style="background:#ffffcc;"|-90|| style="background:#ffffcc;"|-|| style="background:#ffffcc;"|2|| style="background:#ffffcc;"|

|- align=center
|  style="text-align:left; background:#ffffcc;"|2001–02  ᵜ
|  style="text-align:left; background:#ffffcc;"|3rd in Pool 5
| style="background:#ffffcc;"|6|| style="background:#ffffcc;"|2|| style="background:#ffffcc;"|1|| style="background:#ffffcc;"|3|| style="background:#ffffcc;"|126|| style="background:#ffffcc;"|198|| style="background:#ffffcc;"|-72|| style="background:#ffffcc;"|-|| style="background:#ffffcc;"|5|| style="background:#ffffcc;"|

|- align=center
|  style="text-align:left; background:#ffffcc;"|2002–03 ᵜ
|  style="text-align:left; background:#ffffcc;"|
| style="background:#ffffcc;"|6|| style="background:#ffffcc;"|2|| style="background:#ffffcc;"|0|| style="background:#ffffcc;"|4|| style="background:#ffffcc;"|86|| style="background:#ffffcc;"|185|| style="background:#ffffcc;"|+74|| style="background:#ffffcc;"|-|| style="background:#ffffcc;"|19|| style="background:#ffffcc;"|

|- align=center
|  style="text-align:left; background:#ccffcc;"|2003–04 ᵜ
|  style="text-align:left; background:#ccffcc;"|2nd round
| style="background:#ccffcc;"|4|| style="background:#ccffcc;"|3|| style="background:#ccffcc;"|0|| style="background:#ccffcc;"|1|| style="background:#ccffcc;"|107|| style="background:#ccffcc;"|66|| style="background:#ccffcc;"|+41|| style="background:#ccffcc;"|-|| style="background:#ccffcc;"|-|| style="background:#ccffcc;"|(lost to Saracens on aggregate)

|- align=center
|  style="text-align:left; background:#ffffcc;"|2004–05 ᵜ
|  style="text-align:left; background:#ffffcc;"|4th in Pool 3
| style="background:#ffffcc;"|6|| style="background:#ffffcc;"|0|| style="background:#ffffcc;"|0|| style="background:#ffffcc;"|6|| style="background:#ffffcc;"|107|| style="background:#ffffcc;"|186|| style="background:#ffffcc;"|-79|| style="background:#ffffcc;"|2|| style="background:#ffffcc;"|2|| style="background:#ffffcc;"|

|- align=center
|  style="text-align:left; background:#ffffcc;"|2005–06
|  style="text-align:left; background:#ffffcc;"|4th in Pool 5
| style="background:#ffffcc;"|6|| style="background:#ffffcc;"|1|| style="background:#ffffcc;"|0|| style="background:#ffffcc;"|5|| style="background:#ffffcc;"|131|| style="background:#ffffcc;"|190|| style="background:#ffffcc;"|-59|| style="background:#ffffcc;"|2|| style="background:#ffffcc;"|6|| style="background:#ffffcc;"|

|- align=center
|  style="text-align:left; background:#ccffcc;"|2006–07
|  style="text-align:left; background:#ccffcc;"|2nd in Pool 2
| style="background:#ccffcc;"|6|| style="background:#ccffcc;"|4|| style="background:#ccffcc;"|1|| style="background:#ccffcc;"|1|| style="background:#ccffcc;"|204|| style="background:#ccffcc;"|72|| style="background:#ccffcc;"|+132|| style="background:#ccffcc;"|4|| style="background:#ccffcc;"|22|| style="background:#ccffcc;"|(lost to Saracens in Qtr-Final)

|- align=center
|  style="text-align:left; background:#ffffcc;"|2007–08
|  style="text-align:left; background:#ffffcc;"|3rd in Pool 4
| style="background:#ffffcc;"|6|| style="background:#ffffcc;"|3|| style="background:#ffffcc;"|0|| style="background:#ffffcc;"|3|| style="background:#ffffcc;"|130|| style="background:#ffffcc;"|127|| style="background:#ffffcc;"|+3|| style="background:#ffffcc;"|4|| style="background:#ffffcc;"|16|| style="background:#ffffcc;"|

|- align=center
|  style="text-align:left; background:#ffffcc;"|2008–09
|  style="text-align:left; background:#ffffcc;"|3rd in Pool 5
| style="background:#ffffcc;"|6|| style="background:#ffffcc;"|2|| style="background:#ffffcc;"|0|| style="background:#ffffcc;"|4|| style="background:#ffffcc;"|134|| style="background:#ffffcc;"|150|| style="background:#ffffcc;"|-16|| style="background:#ffffcc;"|4|| style="background:#ffffcc;"|12|| style="background:#ffffcc;"|

|- align=center
|  style="text-align:left; background:#ffffcc;"|2009–10
|  style="text-align:left; background:#ffffcc;"|3rd in Pool 2
| style="background:#ffffcc;"|6|| style="background:#ffffcc;"|2|| style="background:#ffffcc;"|0|| style="background:#ffffcc;"|4|| style="background:#ffffcc;"|120|| style="background:#ffffcc;"|140|| style="background:#ffffcc;"|-20|| style="background:#ffffcc;"|1|| style="background:#ffffcc;"|9|| style="background:#ffffcc;"|

|- align=center
|  style="text-align:left; background:#ffffcc;"|2010–11
|  style="text-align:left; background:#ffffcc;"|3rd In Pool 6
| style="background:#ffffcc;"|6|| style="background:#ffffcc;"|3|| style="background:#ffffcc;"|0|| style="background:#ffffcc;"|3|| style="background:#ffffcc;"|116|| style="background:#ffffcc;"|141|| style="background:#ffffcc;"|-25|| style="background:#ffffcc;"|0|| style="background:#ffffcc;"|12|| style="background:#ffffcc;"|

|- align=center
|  style="text-align:left; background:#ffffcc;"|2011–12
|  style="text-align:left; background:#ffffcc;"|2nd in Pool 3
| style="background:#ffffcc;"|6|| style="background:#ffffcc;"|2|| style="background:#ffffcc;"|1|| style="background:#ffffcc;"|3|| style="background:#ffffcc;"|131|| style="background:#ffffcc;"|190|| style="background:#ffffcc;"|-59|| style="background:#ffffcc;"|2|| style="background:#ffffcc;"|12|| style="background:#ffffcc;"|

|- align=center
|  style="text-align:left; background:#ffffcc;"|2012–13
|  style="text-align:left; background:#ffffcc;"|4th in Pool 4
| style="background:#ffffcc;"|6|| style="background:#ffffcc;"|1|| style="background:#ffffcc;"|0|| style="background:#ffffcc;"|5|| style="background:#ffffcc;"|70|| style="background:#ffffcc;"|105|| style="background:#ffffcc;"|-35|| style="background:#ffffcc;"|2|| style="background:#ffffcc;"|6|| style="background:#ffffcc;"|

|- align=center
|  style="text-align:left; background:#ffffcc;"|2013–14
|  style="text-align:left; background:#ffffcc;"|4th in Pool 2
| style="background:#ffffcc;"|6|| style="background:#ffffcc;"|2|| style="background:#ffffcc;"|0|| style="background:#ffffcc;"|4|| style="background:#ffffcc;"|98|| style="background:#ffffcc;"|130|| style="background:#ffffcc;"|-32|| style="background:#ffffcc;"|3|| style="background:#ffffcc;"|11|| style="background:#ffffcc;"|

|- align=center
|  style="text-align:left; background:#ffffcc;"|2014–15
|  style="text-align:left; background:#ffffcc;"|3rd in Pool 4
| style="background:#ffffcc;"|6|| style="background:#ffffcc;"|3|| style="background:#ffffcc;"|0|| style="background:#ffffcc;"|3|| style="background:#ffffcc;"|108|| style="background:#ffffcc;"|84|| style="background:#ffffcc;"|+24|| style="background:#ffffcc;"|3|| style="background:#ffffcc;"|15|| style="background:#ffffcc;"|

|- align=center
|  style="text-align:left; background:#ffffcc;"|2015–16
|  style="text-align:left; background:#ffffcc;"|3rd in Pool 3
| style="background:#ffffcc;"|6|| style="background:#ffffcc;"|3|| style="background:#ffffcc;"|0|| style="background:#ffffcc;"|3|| style="background:#ffffcc;"|114|| style="background:#ffffcc;"|96|| style="background:#ffffcc;"|+18|| style="background:#ffffcc;"|2|| style="background:#ffffcc;"|14|| style="background:#ffffcc;"|

|- align=center
|  style="text-align:left; background:#ffffcc;"|2016–17
|  style="text-align:left; background:#ffffcc;"|2nd in Pool 1
| style="background:#ffffcc;"|6|| style="background:#ffffcc;"|4|| style="background:#ffffcc;"|0|| style="background:#ffffcc;"|2|| style="background:#ffffcc;"|160|| style="background:#ffffcc;"|86|| style="background:#ffffcc;"|+74|| style="background:#ffffcc;"|3|| style="background:#ffffcc;"|19|| style="background:#ffffcc;"|(lost to Saracens in Qtr-Final)

|- align=center
|  style="text-align:left; background:#ffffcc;"|2017–18
|  style="text-align:left; background:#ffffcc;"|4th in Pool 3
| style="background:#ffffcc;"|6|| style="background:#ffffcc;"|1|| style="background:#ffffcc;"|0|| style="background:#ffffcc;"|5|| style="background:#ffffcc;"|128|| style="background:#ffffcc;"|199|| style="background:#ffffcc;"|-71|| style="background:#ffffcc;"|3|| style="background:#ffffcc;"|7|| style="background:#ffffcc;"|

|- align=center
|  style="text-align:left; background:#ffffcc;"|2018–19
|  style="text-align:left; background:#ffffcc;"|2nd in Pool 3
| style="background:#ffffcc;"|6|| style="background:#ffffcc;"|4|| style="background:#ffffcc;"|0|| style="background:#ffffcc;"|2|| style="background:#ffffcc;"|147|| style="background:#ffffcc;"|119|| style="background:#ffffcc;"|+28|| style="background:#ffffcc;"|3|| style="background:#ffffcc;"|19|| style="background:#ffffcc;"|(lost to Saracens in Qtr-Final)

|- align=center
|  style="text-align:left; background:#ffffcc;"|2019–20
|  style="text-align:left; background:#ffffcc;"|2nd in Pool 2
| style="background:#ffffcc;"|6|| style="background:#ffffcc;"|3|| style="background:#ffffcc;"|1|| style="background:#ffffcc;"|2|| style="background:#ffffcc;"|141|| style="background:#ffffcc;"|115|| style="background:#ffffcc;"|+26|| style="background:#ffffcc;"|3|| style="background:#ffffcc;"|17|| style="background:#ffffcc;"|

|- align=center
|  style="text-align:left; background:#ffffcc;"|2020–21
|  style="text-align:left; background:#ffffcc;"|12th in Pool B
| style="background:#ffffcc;"|2|| style="background:#ffffcc;"|0|| style="background:#ffffcc;"|0|| style="background:#ffffcc;"|2|| style="background:#ffffcc;"|0|| style="background:#ffffcc;"|70|| style="background:#ffffcc;"|-70|| style="background:#ffffcc;"|0|| style="background:#ffffcc;"|0|| style="background:#ffffcc;"|Glasgow penalised after not fielding a team against Lyon due to covid

|- align=center
|  style="text-align:left; background:#ffffcc;"|2021–22
|  style="text-align:left; background:#ffffcc;"|9th in Pool A
| style="background:#ffffcc;"|4|| style="background:#ffffcc;"|1|| style="background:#ffffcc;"|0|| style="background:#ffffcc;"|3|| style="background:#ffffcc;"|82|| style="background:#ffffcc;"|117|| style="background:#ffffcc;"|-35|| style="background:#ffffcc;"|1|| style="background:#ffffcc;"|5|| style="background:#ffffcc;"|

|- align=center
|  style="text-align:left; background:#ccffcc;"|2022–23
|  style="text-align:left; background:#ccffcc;"|
| style="background:#ccffcc;"|4|| style="background:#ccffcc;"|3|| style="background:#ccffcc;"|1|| style="background:#ccffcc;"|0|| style="background:#ccffcc;"|107|| style="background:#ccffcc;"|82|| style="background:#ccffcc;"|+25|| style="background:#ccffcc;"|2|| style="background:#ccffcc;"|16|| style="background:#ccffcc;"|
|}

Finals Results

Pro12/Pro14

List of games played against international opposition

For international games in amateur era see: Glasgow District
Competing as Glasgow Warriors unless stated.
Scores and results list Glasgow Warrior's points tally first.
Competing as ᵜ Glasgow Rugby.
Competing as β Glasgow Caledonian Reds.

Current standings

United Rugby Championship

European Challenge Cup

Coaches & Management

Coaches

Management

Current squad

Academy players

Notable former coaches & management

Former Head coaches

Former Assistant Coaches

Former Managing Director / Chief Executive Officers

Notable former players

NOTE: This section is for FORMER players only. Current players should not be added to this section.

For amateur era see:

For a list of competitive debuts for all professional era players see:

Former Club Captains

Double Centurions

Former players who have reached the 200 caps mark for Glasgow Warriors. Competitive matches only.
Players not given a full senior international rugby union cap by their country under World Rugby rules. ♟

Centurions

Former players who have reached the 100 caps mark for Glasgow Warriors. Competitive matches only.
Players not given a full senior international rugby union cap by their country under World Rugby rules. ♟

British and Irish Lions from Glasgow Warriors
The following former Glasgow players, in addition to representing Scotland, have also represented the British and Irish Lions.

Scotland 
The following (not previously listed above) former Glasgow players have represented Scotland at full international level.

Notable non-Scottish players
The following is a list of notable non-Scottish (not previously listed above) international representative former Glasgow players:

Notable also outside rugby

The following is a list of notable (not previously listed above) former Glasgow players who have achieved notability in fields outwith rugby:

  Danny Ablett – Royal Navy surgeon, Operational Service Medal for Afghanistan
  Nick Campbell – Scottish heavyweight boxing champion
  Joe Naufahu – Actor, Game of Thrones season 6
  Gerwyn Price – Professional darts player, Professional Darts Corporation, world number one and world champion.

Personnel honours and records

Celtic League Team of the Year

2006–07:  Euan Murray (1)
2007–08: no Glasgow Warriors represented (0)
2008–09: no Glasgow Warriors represented (0)
2009–10:  Al Kellock,  John Barclay,  Dan Parks (3)
2010–11:  Richie Gray (1)

Pro12 Team of the Year

2011–12:  Jon Welsh,  Tom Ryder,  Duncan Weir  (3)
2012–13:  Ryan Grant,  Al Kellock,  Nikola Matawalu,  Stuart Hogg Glasgow Warriors players top representations (4)
2013–14:   Alex Dunbar (1)
2014–15:  Josh Strauss,  Peter Horne,  Tommy Seymour  (3)
2015–16:  Leone Nakarawa (1)
2016–17:  Tommy Seymour  (1)

Pro14 Team of the Year

2017–18:  Callum Gibbins (capt),  Nick Grigg  (2)
2018–19:  Zander Fagerson  (1)
2019–20: no Glasgow Warriors represented (0)
2020–21:  Huw Jones  (1)

United Rugby Championship Team of the Year

2021–22: no Glasgow Warriors represented (0)

References

External links

 

 
Scottish rugby union teams
Scottish professional rugby union teams
Rugby clubs established in 1996
1996 establishments in Scotland
Sports teams in Glasgow
Rugby union in Glasgow
United Rugby Championship teams